Walter Gresham Andrews (July 16, 1889 – March 5, 1949) was an American politician and a Republican member of the United States House of Representatives from New York.

Biography
Andrews was born in Evanston, Illinois the son of William Henry and Kate (Gresham) Andrews; his grandfather and namesake was U.S. Secretary of State Walter Q. Gresham. He attended the public schools of Buffalo, New York, graduated from Lawrenceville School in 1908 and from Princeton Law School in 1913.

Career
Andrews was head coach of the Princeton Tigers football team in 1913.

During World War I, he served on the Mexican border as a private, Troop I, First New York Cavalry, in 1916. Commissioned second lieutenant, he was with the Machine Gun Group, First New York Cavalry, in 1917. He served in France with the 107th Infantry Regiment, Twenty-seventh Division, and was promoted to major.  In 1918, he was wounded in an attack on the Hindenberg Line.  He was awarded the Distinguished Service Cross.

After the war, Andrews was employed as superintendent and central sales manager, Pratt & Lambert, Inc., Buffalo, New York, until 1925.

He was supervisor of the fifteenth federal census for the seventh district of New York in 1929 and 1930, and director of the Buffalo General Hospital.

Elected to Congress in 1930, Andrews served from March 4, 1931 until January 3, 1945 for the 40th District; and from January 3, 1945 to January 3, 1949 for the 42nd District.  He was chairman of the United States House Committee on Armed Services, during the 80th United States Congress. He was not a candidate for renomination, due to physicians advising him to take things easier.

Death
Andrews died in a hotel at Daytona Beach, Florida from a heart attack on March 5, 1949 (age 59 years, 232 days). He was cremated, and his ashes are interred at Old Fort Niagara Cemetery, Youngstown, New York.

Head coaching record

References

External links
 
 

1889 births
1949 deaths
United States Army personnel of World War I
People from Evanston, Illinois
Politicians from Buffalo, New York
Lawrenceville School alumni
Princeton Tigers football coaches
Princeton Tigers football players
Recipients of the Distinguished Service Cross (United States)
Republican Party members of the United States House of Representatives from New York (state)
20th-century American politicians
United States Army officers
Military personnel from Illinois